

Tuesday, June 1, 1920
Adolfo de la Huerta was sworn into office as President of Mexico. The former Governor of Mexico's Sonora state had prompted the revolution that had toppled the government of President Carranza in May.
U.S. President Woodrow Wilson's request to Congress to agree to a U.S. mandate over Armenia, similar to the British and French mandates over former Ottoman territories in the Middle East, was rejected by the U.S. Senate, 52 to 23.  
The U.S. Supreme Court ruled in Hawke v. Smith that Ohio could not hold a referendum to reverse its ratification of the Prohibition amendment (the 18th Amendment to the U.S. Constitution), holding that after the constitution is amended, the ratification cannot be taken back.  Ohio, which had become the 36th and ratifying state in 1919, had authorized the holding of a public vote on the issue of retraction, but a restraining order had been issued by a lower court to prevent the printing of ballots.  The ruling also meant that state legislatures couldn't take back ratifications of the 19th Amendment permitting women's suffrage.  
The Supreme Court ruled also that the salaries paid to the U.S. president and to federal judges were tax-exempt income.
Born: Colonel Amos Yarkoni, Bedouin Arab Muslim who became a decorated officer within the Israel Defense Forces; as Abd el-Majid Hidr in Na'ura (d. 1991)

Wednesday, June 2, 1920
In the first known U.S. presidential veto of a bill because of bad grammar, President Wilson vetoed House Resolution 7629, an amendment to the federal penal code that added "licentious motion-picture films" to the list of items not permitted to be transported across state lines  Writing "I return herewith without my signature" House Resolution 7629, Wilson noted that the phrase "subject to the jurisdiction thereof" was in the wrong place in a sentence and that "an obvious error has occurred" and that "I have had the change definitely indicated by appropriate pencil marks." p36.  Congressman Thomas L. Blanton of Texas urged a new resolution, saying "There is nothing improper in the President of the United States correcting the English of the House or Senate, is there?" and his colleague Joseph Walsh of Massachusetts replied (with bad grammar), "Not at all; not when their English is incorrect."  House Resolution 14384 was hastily passed with the corrected version and signed by Wilson on the same day.
Dr. Manuel Gondra was elected as the President of Paraguay by the national legislature.  Gondra had previously served as acting president for seven weeks in 1911, and had later been the Paraguayan Ambassador to the United States.
Delaware rejected the 19th Amendment to the U.S. Constitution, which was to provide women with the right to vote.  The Delaware State Senate, on the final day of its annual session, voted 24 against and only 10 for the amendment  "The First State" would finally ratify on March 6, 1923, more than two years after the amendment had become part of the constitution.
Born: 
Tex Schramm (Texas Earnest Schram Jr.), influential U.S. professional football executive, general manager of the Dallas Cowboys for the franchise's first 30 seasons and Pro Football Hall of Fame inductee; in San Gabriel, California (d. 2003)
Johnny Speight, English television writer known for BBC1's Till Death Us Do Part, the inspiration for the U.S. series All in the Family; in East London (d. 1998)
Marcel Reich-Ranicki, Polish-born German literary critic; in Wloclawek (d. 2013)

Thursday, June 3, 1920
USS Tennessee, the first of the U.S. Navy's "Super-dreadnought battleships", was commissioned at the Brooklyn Navy Yard.  Only one other Tennessee-class ship, USS California, was also being constructed.

Friday, June 4, 1920
The Treaty of Trianon was signed between the Allied Powers of World War I, and Hungary, which lost 72% of its territory within the former Austro-Hungarian Empire.  The treaty was so unpopular that the Hungarian government had difficulty in finding anyone willing to sign the treaty, until Minister Plenipotentiary Alfred Detrashe Lazas and Minister of Labor Auguste Bernard agreed to do the task of agreeing to the breakup. A contributor to The Guardian called it "The most disastrous event in the long history of the ancient kingdom of Hungary was completed this afternoon in the long hall of the Grand Trianon at Versailles, when her two representatives put their signature at the foot of the treaty."   
U.S. President Woodrow Wilson vetoed the federal budget for the 1921 fiscal year, because it contained an amendment that interfered with his authority to remove executive branch appointees.  The U.S. House of Representatives, holding a long session before adjournment for the summer, failed to override the veto in a vote taken after midnight.

Saturday, June 5, 1920
The Merchant Marine Act of 1920, one of several different U.S. laws referred to as "The Jones Act", was signed into law.  The new law released U.S. government control (during peacetime) of American merchant ships to private companies and provided that "No merchandise shall be transported by water... on penalty of forfeiture thereof... between points in the United States... in any other vessel than a vessel built in and documented under the laws of the United States and owned by persons who are citizens of the United States."  The law provides now that U.S. ships allowed to transport from one U.S. port to another must be owned by companies with at least 75% U.S. ownership, with a crew made up of at least 75% U.S. citizens, and must be built and registered in the U.S.  Critics of the Jones Act have described it as "an archaic, burdensome law" whose result has been "to impose significant costs on the U.S. economy while providing few of the promised benefits."
Julius Lörzing became the first botanist to find the rare carnivorous pitcher plant Nepenthes spectabilis, which grows only in the mountains of island of Sumatra in Indonesia.
The United States Women's Bureau, which celebrates its centennial in 2020, was created as a federal agency within the U.S. Department of Labor.
Born: Marion Motley, African-American professional football running back and one of the first black pro players after World War II, Pro Football Hall of Fame inductee; in Leesburg, Georgia (d. 1999)
Died: 
Rhoda Broughton, 79, popular Welsh novelist
Julia A. Moore, 72, American poet known for her famously bad poetry

Sunday, June 6, 1920
In elections for the Reichstag in Germany, the Social Democratic Party (SPD) retained a plurality, but lost one-third of its 165 seats, while the Independent Social Democratic Party of Germany (USPD), made up of former leftist SPD members, gained 61 seats to more than triple its representation in the Reichstag.  Herman Mueller, recently resigned German Chancellor, tried to forge a coalition government that would include his Social Democrats.

Monday, June 7, 1920
The Ku Klux Klan racist movement, the Knights of the Ku Klux Klan, began a public relations campaign to increase its membership nationwide.  The Klan hired the Southern Publicity Association, founded in Atlanta by Bessie Tyler of the Daughters of America, and Edward Young Clarke, an Imperial Wizard of the Klan Wyn.
The U.S. Supreme Court upheld seven separate cases challenging the ratification of the unpopular Eighteenth Amendment to the U.S. Constitution and the enforcement of its prohibition of the general sale of alcohol.  The court also upheld a challenge to the Volstead Act's provision that limited the amount of alcoholic content in drink to no more than 0.5 percent or one proof.
The Prime Minister of Portugal, António Maria Baptista, was conducting a meeting of his cabinet at Lisbon when he was "seized with an attack of congestion of the lungs" shortly after midnight.  The city of Akhisar fell on the same day.
The Northern Baptist Convention, meeting in Buffalo, New York, became the second American denomination of Christian churches to vote to withdraw from the Interchurch World Movement effective June 30.  The members agreed to pay $2.5 million that it had pledged in the nationwide fundraiser by Protestant denominations in April, but to otherwise halt aid immediately.  At the end of May, the Presbyterian Church terminated its association with the Interchurch movement.

Friday, June 25, 1920

Arturo Alessandri won the 1920 Chilean presidential election.  This was the last Chilean election to have been decided by the Chilean electoral college.  Luis Barros Borgoño won a majority of popular votes by a margin of 1,007 votes (83,100 to 82,083) but Alessandri had 179 electoral votes to Barros's 175.
Russia's White Army General Pyotr Wrangel defeated the Soviet army in the Crimea and captured 10,000 prisoners.
Kitty Gordon, British stage actress who had left London to perform in the United States, accidentally shot and wounded another actor while she was performing in a vaudeville show.  Miss Gordon's partner in the vaudeville act, Jack Wilson, had brought along a pistol "for the double duty of serving as a stage 'prop' and guarding Miss Gordon's '$250,000 worth of jewels'."  While reloading the gun with blanks, Wilson overlooked having a loaded cartridge in the chamber.  Waiting off stage was the next act in the program, the acrobatic trio of Page, Hack and Mack.  The bullet struck Joseph A. Hack and wounded him.  Hack was hospitalized, but recovered from his injuries 
Born: 
Jeanne Tomasini, French historical novelist; in L'Estaque (d. 2022)
Lassie Lou Ahern, American child actress and one of the last survivors of the silent film era; in Los Angeles (d. 2018)

Saturday, June 26, 1920
Royal Navy battleships from the United Kingdom aided the Greek invasion of Turkey by bombarding the city of İzmit, a base of operations for Turkish nationalists.  A dispatch from Greece reported that 1,000 Turks had been killed   
António Maria da Silva formed a new government for Portugal, replacing José Ramos Preto as Prime Minister of Portugal.  Ramos had served for 11 days before resigning on June 18.
Lou Gehrig, a 17-year old player for the New York School of Commerce high school team, got his first publicity for his baseball ability in the "World Series of High Schools" tournament held at Cubs Park in Chicago.  In front of 10,000 spectators, Gehrig hit a grand slam home run over the right field wall in the ninth inning for a 12 to 6 win over Chicago's Lane Tech High School.  Several newspapers, including the New York Daily News, misspelled the future Hall of Famer's name in their reports.

Sunday, June 27, 1920
British Army Brigadier General Cuthbert Lucas  was kidnapped by the Sinn Féin in Ireland while fishing on the River Blackwater near Fermoy in County Cork.  After a month in captivity and the threat of execution, General Lucas was able to escape on July 30.
Bertram G. Goodhue was selected as the architect for the new Nebraska State Capitol, as a panel of three non-resident architects favored his 15-story tall proposal over nine other plans that were submitted.  One newspaper referred to Goodhue's design as a "freak type of tower" and a "Woolworth building capitol" favored by a group of outsiders that "was evidently partial to the New York skyscraper style of architecture," and complained that "The capitol commission had previously tied its own hands to such an extent that it was forced to take the 'jury's' selection and could not use its own judgment, if it had so desired, in giving the preference to something more suited to Nebraska's conditions and western ideals."  
Born: Fernando Riera, Chilean football player who played for (1942-1950) and later managed (1958-1962) the Chile national football team in World Cup competition; in Santiago (d. 2010)
Died: Adolphe-Basile Routhier, 81, Canadian judge and author of the French lyrics to the anthem "O Canada"

Monday, June 28, 1920
The Democratic Party National Convention opened at San Francisco 
Governor of Tennessee Albert H. Roberts announced that he would call a special session of the state legislature after the state Democratic primaries, directing the state senators and representatives to meet on August 9 for purposes of considering the proposed 19th Amendment to the U.S. Constitution, granting all American women the right to vote.  At the time, 35 of the 48 U.S. states had ratified the amendment, and only one more was required to provide the necessary two-thirds for it to become law.
U.S. Army Sergeant Boterill inadvertently set a record for highest altitude for a parachute jump, when a high wind opened his chute while he was riding in a two-seat airplane at  near Dayton, Ohio.  Botterill sustained a broken arm when he struck the plane's rudder and was reportedly "carried for miles by the wind before he descended nearly four miles to the earth."
Born: Clarissa Eden, Countess of Avon, British socialite who was the niece of Prime Minister Winston Churchill and the wife of Prime Minister Anthony Eden; as Anne Clarissa Spencer-Churchill in Kensington (living in 2021)

Tuesday, June 29, 1920
Warren G. Harding, the Republican nominee for the U.S. presidential election recorded a campaign speech to be duplicated on phonographic records that could be played at political rallies   The theme of Harding's address was "America First", with the closing statement "Call it the selfishness of nationality if you will; I think it an inspiration to patriotic devotion; to safeguard America first; to stabilize America first; to exalt America first; and to live for and revere America first.".  Harding and vice-presidential nominee Calvin Coolidge, who recorded a separate speech, made few public appearances during the actual campaign.  The records were put in circulation on July 4.
Born: Ray Harryhausen, American film animator and pioneer in special effects, particularly the perfection of stop motion; in Los Angeles (d. 2013)

Wednesday, June 30, 1920
The month of June, 1920, closed with the highest ever inflation rate that has ever been recorded by the U.S. Bureau of Labor Statistics, with the Consumer Price Index later showing the annual inflation rate peaking, with prices for consumer goods and services being 23.7 percent higher in June 1920 than they had been more than they had been at the end of June 1919.  In the 12 months that followed June 1920, prices went back down 15.8 percent.
The Turkish delegation to the Paris peace conference announced that it would recognize the independence of Armenia, Hedjaz (now Saudi Arabia), Syria (now Syria and Lebanon), Mesopotamia (now Iraq) and Palestine (now Israel and Jordan). Turkey also renounced its rights to former territory in Egypt, to control the Suez Canal and the Sudan, and to eight islands in the Aegean Sea, as well as recognizing France's protectorates over Tunisia and Morocco and the United Kingdom's annexation of Cyprus.  The Turks refused to cede the city of İzmir (Smyrna) and protested the cession of Eastern Thrace to Greece. 
Born: 
Soedarpo Sastrosatomo, Indonesian banker and founder of CIMB Niaga; in Pangkalan Susu (d. 2007)
Eleanor Ross Taylor, American poet who achieved fame at the age of 77; in Norwood, North Carolina (d. 2011)
Zeno Colò, Italian slalom ski racer and 1952 Olympic gold medalist; in Cutigliano, Tuscany (d. 1993)

References

1920
1920-06
1920-06